This is a list of lighthouses in Egypt, which are located along both the Mediterranean and Red Sea coastlines of this North African country. The list includes active maritime lighthouses that are named landfall lights, or that have a range of at least fifteen nautical miles. The Admiralty number is that used in Admiralty List of Lights and Fog Signals Light List.

Lighthouses on the Mediterranean Sea
The following lighthouses are located on or near the Mediterranean Sea.

Lighthouses on the Red Sea
The following lighthouses are located on or near the Red Sea.

Gallery

See also
List of lighthouses in Libya (to the west)
List of lighthouses in Israel (to the east)
List of lighthouses in Sudan (to the south)
Lists of lighthouses and lightvessels

References

External links

Egypt
Lighthouse
Lighthouses